The list of ship commissionings in 1869 includes a chronological list of all ships commissioned in 1869.


References

See also 

1869
 Ship commissionings